Bi is a Chinese surname. It is listed 76th in the Song dynasty classic text, the Hundred Family Surnames.

Notable people
Bi Chunfang (born 1927), Yue opera singer
Bi Feiyu (born 1964), fiction writer
Bi Fujian (born 1959), professor and television presenter
Bi Gui (died 249), official during the Three Kingdoms period
Bi Hongyong (born 1974), high jumper
Bi Jingquan (born 1955), economist and trade official
Bi Jinhao (born 1991), football player
Bi Sheng (990–1051), inventor of printing technology
Bi Shiduo (died 888), Tang dynasty army officer
Bi Wenjing (born 1981), gymnast
Bi Wenjun (born 1997), singer and actor, member of NEXT
Bi Xian (802–864), Tang dynasty official
Bi Xiaoliang (born 1992), high jumper
Bi Yan (born 1984), women's soccer player
Bi Hansheng, Chinese name adopted by Irish comedian Des Bishop (born 1975)
Kenneth Bi, Hong Kong-Canadian actor
Alan Bi, Aspiring Banker at Furman University

References

Chinese-language surnames
Individual Chinese surnames